Chidambara Rahasiyam is a 1985 Indian Tamil-language comedy thriller film written and directed by Visu. It stars Visu, S. Ve. Shekher, Delhi Ganesh, Arun Pandian, Ilavarasi and Manorama. The film revolves around a simpleton (S. Ve. Shekher) who is framed for murder. Here enters Visu who teams up with the local police and Arun Pandian to find the real culprits. The subject matter of the film is not related directly to Chidambara Rahasiyam, a Hindu religious belief. The film was released on 14 December 1985.

Plot 
Chidambaram, a good-hearted simpleton from a rich family in Karaikudi is in love with his cousin Uma. Uma is a well-educated girl and in love with Arun, her college-mate. When Chidambaram's parents Kaathamuthu Chettiyar and Valayapatti Valliammai speak to Uma's parents (Ponnazhagi and her husband) about getting their children married, Ponnazhagi insults Chidambaram for his stupidity. So, Chidambaram sets to find a job and earn money so that he can ask Uma's hand in marriage with respect. Ambalavaanan, a diamond smuggler offers him a job. But Chidambaram, who unknowingly transports the diamonds gets caught by the police, and escapes from them. What ensues is a series of unexpected twists and turns for Chidambaram and he is wrongly accused of burglary at LIC Natarajan's house, and murder of dancer Aasha, all incidents happening in Karaikudi and nearby localities. The impossibility of him having committed all three crimes gives him the benefit of doubt by the police, who seek the assistance of CID officer Beemarao.

Beemarao is attacked by goons on his arrival to Karaikudi, and he is saved by Arun. Arun invites Beemarao to stay with him at this father Masilamani's palatial house. Beemarao talks to Chidambaram and is convinced that he is innocent, and he has his first doubt of someone else's hand in the crimes. Beemarao is helped by Arun and Uma on the investigation of Chidambaram's case. There are a couple of attempts to kill Beemarao, by loosening the screw of the fan in his room, and by putting a snake in his torchlight. Beemarao survives both the incidents, and suspects Arun of planning these two attacks, but is still unsure of who was responsible for it. Beemarao also manages to get various clues from Ambalavaanan's house, LIC Natarajan's house and Aasha's house, but somehow the information is leaked from within his circle and the investigation is thwarted.

Later it is revealed that Masilamani is an underworld gangster dealing with smuggling, robbery and women, and he was the one who had been leaking the information to his gang. Through clever deduction and effort, Beemarao finally deduces that Masilamani was responsible for all the crimes, and apologises to Arun for suspecting Arun earlier. In the end, after a fierce gunfight between the police and the criminals, Masilamani is caught and is arrested by Arun himself. After this, the Police offer Arun a job, and he marries Uma. Chidambaram gets acquitted in the case, but is heart broken to see Uma marry someone else. He consoles himself and helps Uma and Arun with their wedding chores.

Cast 

 S. Ve. Shekher as Chidambaram
 Visu as Beemarao
 Arun Pandian as Arun
 Ilavarasi as Uma
 Delhi Ganesh as Masilamani / Black cat
 Kishmu as Kattamuthu Chettiyar
 Manorama as Valayapatti Valliammai
 G. Srinivasan as Chidambaram's uncle Nachiappan
 LIC Narasimhan as Victim of robbery
 Sethu Vinayagam as Inspector
 Ganthimathi as Ponnazhagi
 Anuradha in a special appearance
 Disco Shanti as Aasha
 Sangili Murugan as Ambalavaanan
 Omakuchi Narasimhan as Van driver
 T. P. Gajendran as Advocate Agathiyan

Production 
Chidambara Rahasiyam is the acting debut of Arun Pandian.

Soundtrack 
The soundtrack was composed by Shankar–Ganesh.

Notes

References

External links 
 

1980s comedy mystery films
1980s comedy thriller films
1980s Tamil-language films
1985 comedy films
1985 films
1985 thriller films
Films directed by Visu
Films scored by Shankar–Ganesh
Films with screenplays by Visu
Indian comedy mystery films
Indian comedy thriller films